Komiya (written: 小宮) is a Japanese surname. Notable people with the surname include:

, Japanese actress and voice actress
, Japanese sprinter
, Japanese voice actress
Masae Komiya (born 1975), Japanese goalball player
, Japanese volleyball player

Fictional characters
, protagonist of the manga series Shōnen Maid
, a character in the anime series Just Because!
, a character in the anime series Aggretsuko
, protagonist of the anime series Celestial Method
, a character in the manga series Nekogami Yaoyorozu

See also
Komiya Station, a railway station in Hachiōji, Tokyo, Japan

Japanese-language surnames